Barlaston railway station served the village of Barlaston in Staffordshire, England. This station was opened on 17 April 1848 and is on the first line opened by the North Staffordshire Railway on that date. At some times it was called Barlaston and Tittensor after the slightly more distant village of Tittensor.

History 
Trains no longer stop at Barlaston. The  to  local service was withdrawn when the route was temporarily closed for major refurbishment on 23 May 2004 as part of the West Coast Main Line modernisation scheme and never reinstated. Access to the platforms is no longer possible as the station has been fenced off.

Barlaston is not included as a stop on the  –  service operated by West Midlands Trains. The new franchise, West Midlands Trains may see the station reopened to passenger services.

Barlaston is mentioned in the ghost or parliamentary train list maintained by Ghost Train Hunters enthusiasts group. The North Staffs Rail Promotion Group campaign for the restoration of the train service continues.

The Department for Transport stated that the rail replacement service would continue whilst it sought a "sustainable solution" to the demand for the restoration of train services when it awarded the West Midlands Rail franchise in 2018. As from April 2021 it funds this rail replacement service in accordance with Passenger Service Level Commitment No 2 of 2008. The bustitution is currently in its 
eighteenth year, allegedly the longest running scheduled rail replacement in history.

Plans to officially close  to passengers, and reopen , were planned for May 2021. However no Notice of Closure for Wedgwood has been published and there is no service at Barlaston. No notice of closure had been issued for Barlaston.

See also
Railway stations not officially closed with no services in the United Kingdom

References

Further reading

External links 

 Parliamentary Ghost Stations site

Railway stations in Staffordshire
Former North Staffordshire Railway stations
Railway stations in Great Britain opened in 1848
Railway station